In the Iliad, Hecamede (Ancient Greek: Ἑκαμήδη), daughter of Arsinoos, was captured from the isle of Tenedos and given as captive to King Nestor. Described as "skilled as a goddess", "fair" and "proud", Hecamede was not a concubine but a serving woman. In her most prolonged mention, she serves Pramnian wine, a medicinal drink, to Nestor and Machaon.

Notes

References 

 Homer, The Iliad with an English Translation by A.T. Murray, Ph.D. in two volumes. Cambridge, MA., Harvard University Press; London, William Heinemann, Ltd. 1924. . Online version at the Perseus Digital Library.
 Homer, Homeri Opera in five volumes. Oxford, Oxford University Press. 1920. . Greek text available at the Perseus Digital Library.

Women of the Trojan war
Characters in Greek mythology